Kulajan Tiniali is a town in Dhemaji district in the Indian state of Assam. The town is situated on the northern bank of the Brahmaputra River, and is located approximately 493 kilometres from the city of Guwahati and just 13 km from Arunachal Pradesh.
National Highway 15B starts at Kulajan and connects it to Dibrugarh.

People 
Kulajan is mostly inhabited by the Mising, an indigenous Assamese ethnic group in Assam. About 95% of inhabitants are Mising community and only 5% belong to other communities according to 2011 Census of India.Ali Ai Ligang is a local festival. On that day they prepare a local homemade rice beer known as "Apong", available in two varieties i.e. Nogin and Po: Ro. On the eve of Ali Ai Ligang, the Mising girls and boys dress in traditional dress. The festival is celebrated with performing dance and singing Mising Bihu songs. Other festivals like Dobur and Porag are mostly celebrated along with the national festival of the indigenous Assamese communities, i.e. Bihu and other festivals such as Durga Puja, Lakshmi Puja, Diwali, etc. Agriculture, handloom weaving and services are the main source of earning among the people here.

Banking Services 
State Bank of India( Kulajan Branch).

Politics
Kulajan is part of Lakhimpur (Lok Sabha constituency).Mr. Pradan Barua from BJP is the present MP from this constituency. in Assam.
As of 2021, Bhubon Pegu of BJP is the MLA of Kulajan, part of 114 Jonai (ST) Vidhan Sabha.

Education

Schools in kulajan include:
Kulajan high School—Assamese Medium School, Located at kulajan, Established in 1994
Baptist English  School, kulajan—English medium school, located at kulajan, established in 1995

Transportation 
Currently NH-515 is well connected to kulajan from other village of the states and also connecting it with Towns and cities of Arunachal Pradesh and also NH-15B is connected to dibrugarh cities.

See also
Sissiborgaon

References

External links
 About Kulajan

Cities and towns in Dhemaji district